HDW may refer to:
 Howaldtswerke-Deutsche Werft, a German shipbuilder
 Hadley Wood railway station, in London
 Haldwani railway station, in Uttarakhand, India